Mikko Brummer (born 23 July 1954) is a Finnish sailor. He competed in the 470 event at the 1976 Summer Olympics.

References

External links
 

1954 births
Living people
Finnish male sailors (sport)
Olympic sailors of Finland
Sailors at the 1976 Summer Olympics – 470
Sportspeople from Helsinki